Jan Bartůněk (born February 13, 1965) is a Czechoslovak sprint canoer who competed in the late 1980s and early 1990s. He won two medals in the C-1 10000 m at the ICF Canoe Sprint World Championships with a silver in 1990 and a bronze in 1989.

Bartůněk also competed at the 1992 Summer Olympics in Barcelona, finishing eighth in both the C-1 1000 m and the C-2 500 m events.

References

1965 births
Canoeists at the 1992 Summer Olympics
Czechoslovak male canoeists
Living people
Olympic canoeists of Czechoslovakia
ICF Canoe Sprint World Championships medalists in Canadian